Depravity is the second full-length release by metalcore band A Plea for Purging. It was released on hardcore and metal label, Facedown Records and was produced by Joey Sturgis (The Devil Wears Prada, Attack Attack!). The album received generally positive reviews.

Track listing 
All tracks by A Plea for Purging

 "Descension" - 0:27
 "Retribution" - 3:37
 "Malevolence  - 4:00
 "Holocausts" - 3:48
 "Motives" - 3:23
 "Devourer" - 4:29
 "Prevaricator" - 4:27
 "Traitor" - 4:12
 "Misanthropy" (featuring guest vocals by Devin Leach of Alert The Sky)  - 3:18
 "Reputation" - 4:35
 "Depravity" - 6:34

B-sides
 "Live Your Life" - 4:53 cover of "Live Your Life" by T.I. feat. Rihanna)

Personnel
 A Plea for Purging
Andy Atkins - vocals
Blake Martin  - guitar, clean vocals on "Reputation" 
Tyler Wilson - guitar
John Wand - bass
Aaron Eckermann - drums
Guest musicians
Devin Leach (ex-Alert the Sky) - vocals on "Misanthropy"
Production
Produced, Mixed, Mastered, Additional vocals and programming by Joey Sturgis
Engineered by Joey Sturgis and Andy Walker
Layout design by Dave Quiggle
Photography by Taylor Foiles

References

External links 
"A Plea For Purging : Depravity" SoundFaithMusic.com.

Facedown Records albums
2009 albums
A Plea for Purging albums
Albums produced by Joey Sturgis